Martin Hanulák (born October 24, 1987 in Bratislava, Slovakia) is a former Slovak competitive pair skater. He competed with Gabriela Čermanová. They teamed up in November 2007 and are the 2009 & 2010 Slovak national champions. He previously competed with Kristína Kabátová. They were the 2006 Slovakian junior national champions and placed 15th at the 2006 World Junior Figure Skating Championships.

Competitive highlights
(with Cermanova)

External links
 
 

1987 births
Slovak male pair skaters
Figure skaters from Bratislava
Living people